The Sungacha or Songacha ( Sungacha or Сунгач Sungach) is a river marking part of the border between the Russian Federation and the People's Republic of China. It is a left tributary of the Ussuri, and the only outflow of Khanka Lake.

The -long Sungacha's length fluctuates, as the stream bed changes every year.

The river supports a rich diversity of flora and fauna, including Nelumbo nucifera in its basin.

The Sungacha's waters come from rain, snow and springs.

References

Rivers of Primorsky Krai
Rivers of Heilongjiang
International rivers of Asia